Essen III is an electoral constituency (German: Wahlkreis) represented in the Bundestag. It elects one member via first-past-the-post voting. Under the current constituency numbering system, it is designated as constituency 120. It is located in the Ruhr region of North Rhine-Westphalia, comprising the southern part of the city of Essen.

Essen III was created for the inaugural 1949 federal election. Since 2013, it has been represented by Matthias Hauer of the Christian Democratic Union (CDU).

Geography
Essen III is located in the Ruhr region of North Rhine-Westphalia. As of the 2021 federal election, it comprises the Stadtbezirke II (Rüttenscheid/Bergerhausen), III (Essen-West), VIII (Essen-Ruhrhalbinsel), and IX (Werden/Kettwig/Bredeney) from the independent city of Essen.

History
Essen III was created in 1949. In the 1949 election, it was North Rhine-Westphalia constituency 32 in the numbering system. From 1953 through 1961, it was number 91. From 1965 through 1976, it was number 89. From 1980 through 1998, it was number 90. From 2002 through 2009, it was number 121. Since 2013, it has been number 120.

Originally, the constituency comprised the southern parts of the city of Essen. From 1980 through 1998, it comprised Stadtbezirke I (Stadtmitte/Frillendorf), II (Rüttenscheid/Bergerhausen), VIII (Essen-Ruhrhalbinsel), and IX (Werden/Kettwig/Bredeney). It acquired its current borders in the 2002 election.

Members
The constituency was first represented by Jakob Kaiser of the Christian Democratic Union (CDU) from 1949 to 1957, followed by party fellow Hans Toussaint from 1957 to 1969. Antje Huber of the Social Democratic Party (SPD) was elected in 1969, and served until the 1983 election, when Paul Hoffacker of the CDU held it for a single term. Ingrid Becker-Inglau regained it for the SPD in 1987, serving until 2002. Hans-Günter Bruckmann then served a single term from 2002 to 2005, followed by fellow SPD member Petra Hinz from 2005 to 2013. Matthias Hauer of the CDU was elected representative in 2013, and re-elected in 2017 and 2021.

Election results

2021 election

2017 election

2013 election

2009 election

References

Federal electoral districts in North Rhine-Westphalia
1949 establishments in West Germany
Constituencies established in 1949
Essen